Fifth Business (1970) is a novel by Canadian writer Robertson Davies. 
First published by Macmillan of Canada in 1970, it is the first installment of Davies' best-known work, the Deptford Trilogy, and explores the life of the narrator, Dunstan Ramsay. It was the novel that brought Davies to international attention.

Plot summary

Dunstan Ramsay, an aging history teacher at Colborne College, becomes enraged by the patronizing tone of a newspaper article announcing his recent retirement, which appears to portray him as an unremarkable old man with no notable accomplishments to his name. Hoping to prove that he has lived a worthwhile and fulfilling life, Ramsay pens an indignant letter to the school's headmaster relating the story of his life, beginning with a childhood memory of an incident that occurred in his hometown of Deptford, Ontario in December 1908.

During a quarrel with a ten-year-old Ramsay (then known as "Dunstable Ramsay"), Ramsay’s wealthy friend Percy Boyd Staunton angrily hurls a snowball at him, but accidentally hits his heavily pregnant neighbor Mary Dempster, causing her to prematurely give birth to a sickly child called "Paul". Apparently afflicted with severe mental trauma by the incident, Mrs. Dempster's behavior grows progressively more erratic until she is ostracized from polite society after being found having sex with a homeless tramp in a gravel pit, leading Paul Dempster to become an outcast in the village. While Ramsay takes pity on Paul and often keeps him company, Staunton refuses to take responsibility for throwing the snowball. The rift between the two deepens after Staunton begins a romantic relationship with Ramsay's crush Leola Cruikshank.

When Ramsay's gravely injured brother Willie apparently makes a miraculous recovery after Mrs. Dempster prays at his bedside, Ramsay comes to suspect that Mrs. Dempster is capable of performing miracles, which is seemingly confirmed after Ramsay himself has a vision of her shortly before miraculously surviving an artillery blast at the Battle of Ypres in World War I, losing his left leg in the process. Upon awakening in a military hospital from a six-month coma, he learns that he was initially presumed dead and posthumously won a Victoria Cross, and that his parents died from Spanish Influenza before learning that he was still alive. While recovering in the hospital, Ramsay has an affair with nurse Diana Marfleet, but breaks up with her after rejecting her marriage proposal, prompting Diana to playfully nickname him "Dunstan" after the 10th century English saint who supposedly resisted the temptations of the Devil; this conversation later inspires Ramsay to have his first name legally changed to "Dunstan". Upon returning to Deptford, he learns that Staunton has married Leola, while Mrs. Dempster has been taken in by a relative after apparently going insane, and Paul Dempster has run away from home to join the circus.

After becoming a schoolteacher, Ramsay earns a reputation as an eccentric due to his interest in hagiology (the study of saints). Meanwhile, Staunton—now known as "Boy," shortened from his middle name—becomes a fabulously wealthy businessman. Despite tacitly resenting Boy for his money and status, Ramsay maintains an uneasy friendship with him and Leola, often accepting his financial assistance. Later, Ramsay becomes convinced that Mrs. Dempster is a saint following a chance encounter with Joel Surgeoner—the man who had sex with her in the gravel pit—who miraculously turned his life around after his sexual encounter with her. After successfully tracking Mrs. Dempster to Toronto, Ramsay offers to become her caretaker.

Following the birth of her son David, Leola becomes increasingly unhappy with her marriage to Boy, finding herself unable to adjust to high-society life due to her provincial upbringing. The Stauntons' marital difficulties culminate in Leola unsuccessfully attempting suicide on Christmas Eve in 1936 after a fight with Boy. When Leola dies of pneumonia a few years later, Ramsay suspects that she intentionally brought about her death by leaving her window open.

Ramsay's deepening obsession with hagiology leads him to travel to Europe to meet with the Bollandists (a society of Jesuit scholars who chronicle the lives of saints) after they agree to publish one of his articles. During his trip, he develops a close relationship with elderly Jesuit priest Padre Blazon, who specializes in chronicling the earthly side of saints' lives, believing that most saints are much more flawed and human than history might choose to remember them. 

While in Mexico City on a six-month sabbatical from Colborne College, Ramsay attends a magic show put on by the mysterious illusionist Magnus Eisengrim, who is revealed to be an adult Paul Dempster. Intrigued by Eisengrim's spectacular illusions, Ramsay joins his entourage as he tours the world with his magic act, and gradually becomes close to Eisengrim's wealthy patroness Liesl, an eccentric woman with a bizarre androgynous appearance. Liesl, who becomes Ramsay's lover, senses that he has never been truly happy, having spent most of his life being overshadowed by other people whose lives have intersected with his own. To help him make sense of his role in the world, Liesl suggests that Ramsay is fated to play the part of "fifth business," a term for a supporting player in a stage show whose role can’t be easily classified, but nonetheless plays a vital role in resolving the plot.

Ramsay's recollections ultimately reach their climax in 1968 after Ramsay and Eisengrim both cross paths with Boy following a show in Toronto. In a tense conversation, Eisengrim reveals his true identity to Boy, and Ramsay tells Eisengrim about the events in December 1908 that led to his premature birth. Recalling the incident, Ramsay states that the snowball that Boy threw at Mrs. Dempster had a rock concealed in it, and claims that he still has the rock. Boy, however, still refuses to admit to throwing the snowball, denying any responsibility for Mrs. Dempster's misfortunes. After Boy and Eisengrim storm out of the room, Ramsay finds the rock missing.

Hours later, Boy is found dead in his car after apparently driving into a river, leaving the police unsure whether his death was murder or suicide. Curiously, a stone is found placed in his mouth, which Ramsay believes to be the rock that Boy threw at Mrs. Dempster as a child. Later, while watching a fortune-telling display at Eisengrim's magic show, Ramsay collapses from a sudden heart attack after someone in the audience cries out "Who killed Boy Staunton?" Onstage, the fortune-telling "Brazen Head" cryptically replies that he was killed by five people: by himself, by the woman he knew, by the woman he did not know, by the man who granted his inmost wish, and by "the inevitable fifth, who was keeper of his conscience and the keeper of the stone."

With that, Ramsay concludes the story of his life, saying only, "And that, headmaster, is all I have to tell you."

Themes

Davies discusses several themes in the novel, perhaps the most important being the difference between materialism and spirituality. Davies asserts religion is not necessarily integral to the idea—demonstrated by the corrupt Reverend Leadbeater who reduces the Bible to mere economic terms.

Davies, then an avid student of Carl Jung's ideas, deploys them in Fifth Business. Characters are clear examples of Jungian archetypes and events demonstrate Jung's idea of synchronicity. A stone allegedly thrown at Ramsay when he was a child reappears decades later in a scandalous suicide or murder. Ramsay's character is a classic introverted personality, contrasted throughout the book with the extroverted sensuality of Boy Staunton. Ramsay dedicates his life to genuine religious feeling as he saw it in his 'fool-saint' Mary Dempster, whose son grows up to be the very archetype of the Magician.

Robertson Davies' interest in psychology has a massive influence on the actions in the book.  The prominence of matriarchs in Dunstan's life can be linked to Sigmund Freud's Oedipus complex (Dunstan loves Diana and Mrs. Dempster, despite their motherly positions in his life).  Carl Jung's concept of individualisation plays a role when Liesl discusses Dunstan's yet-unlived life and the idea that he must have balance in his life.  Erik Erikson's stages of psychosocial development can also be seen in the choices Boy makes compared to the choices Dunstan makes (e.g. Boy chooses intimacy while Dunstan chooses isolation).

A genuinely learned man, Davies wrote a prose that both poked fun at pretentious scholarship and enjoyed joking allusions, as in the names of Ramsay's girl friends, Agnes Day, Gloria Mundy and Libby Doe. He explained these later as "Agnes, the Sufferer – a type well known to all men; Gloria, the Good Time Girl, and Libby, the energetic go-getter".  Agnes Day is a play on the Latin religious phrase agnus Dei, "lamb of God". Libby Doe is a play on the word "libido", borrowed from Latin by Freud to mean the inner impulse-driven part of the psyche. Gloria Mundy is a play on the Latin religious phrase Sic transit gloria mundi, or "Thus passes the glory of the world."

Religion and morality
There is sectarianism in Deptford dividing the frontier townsfolk between five Christian churches that do not associate with each other under normal circumstances. It takes emergency situations for them to lend aid to each other, but this is conditional aid based on the assumption that certain moral codes will be preserved regardless of faith. For instance, Mary Dempster is a daft-headed girl who habitually flouts the norms of the society, and so she finds herself ostracised and ridiculed by it, evidenced by the fact that no one comes to her aid when her son runs away. However, she is the only member of Deptford society that Dunstan views as truly 'religious' in her attitude because she lives according to a light that arises from within (which he contrasts with her husband's 'deeply religious' attitude, which 'meant that he imposed religion as he understood it on everything he knew or encountered' (46)).

As a boy, Dunstable is raised as a Presbyterian, but he also takes an avid interest in Catholic saints. He grows up to develop a more spiritual mode of life that is not reliant on external structures. For Dunstan Ramsay, religion and morality are immediate certainties in life, and the events of the novel show how moral lapses have a way of 'snowballing' and coming back to haunt one.

Myth and history
Davies and Dunstan are at pains to illustrate just how fluid the concept of historical fact really is, and that it is not so distinct from the suppositions of mythic thinking. Dunstan questions the extent that he can provide an accurate account of the events of his childhood or his participation in World War I campaigns, because what he recalls is surely distinct from the 'consensually accepted reality'.

One aspect of this blurred distinction between myth and history is Ramsay's lifelong preoccupation with the lives of the Saints. The fantastic nature of their stories were always grounded in actual events, but their miracles were given attention and focus based on the psychosocial attitudes and needs of the day, so that what the public wanted had a large measure of influence over what became the accepted canon.

The novel and Davies' life

Some readers thought that Fifth Business was intended to be semi-autobiographical. Davies projected some of his life experiences (childhood in a small Ontario town, family connections with the social and financial elite) into many of his works. He thought of this novel as "autobiographical, but not as young men do it; it will be rather as Dickens wrote David Copperfield, a fictional reworking of some things experienced and much re-arranged."

Davies allows us to peer through a window into his childhood in Thamesville, Ontario and through his young life into higher education and beyond through the character of Ramsay and the novels of the Deptford trilogy. In Fifth Business, Davies provides an account of his spirit, his memories, and his deeper life experiences. Or, as Diane Cole wrote in the New York Times soon after Davies' death, "Davies used his personal myths and archetypes to probe the possibilities of human good and evil, but always with a wickedly humorous wink."

Some of the elements of character Percy Boyd Staunton's life resemble that of Davies' friend Vincent Massey. Both men became rich from their father's agricultural businesses. Both men enlisted in World War I, went into politics afterward and held cabinet positions, and strengthened Canada's ties with the mother country. Massey was appointed as the first Canada-born Governor General, Boy is likewise appointed Lieutenant-Governor of Ontario. The most convincing parallel is that Boy becomes the chair of the board of Governors which runs the school at which Ramsay teaches, much as Robertson Davies spent his career at the University of Toronto as the Master of Massey College. But the Staunton character is highly fictionalized. Davies has said that aspects of the character are more reflective of his father.

Title

Pressured by his publisher to define "Fifth Business," Davies added this opening quotation. Queried later by the book's Norwegian translator Sigmund Hoftun who failed to find the quotation in the (authentic) Danish book, Davies wrote to him 13 August 1979, "it is not from Overskou, because I invented it."

Principal characters
Dunstan (Dunstable) Ramsay – The protagonist and narrator. Ramsay has been offended by his retirement notice in the College Chronicle and intends to prove he has had an interesting life. He served in World War I and received a Victoria Cross. He becomes a scholar of saints and myths, and spends time with Bollandist scholars.
'Boy' (Percy Boyd) Staunton – Ramsay's "lifelong friend and enemy" who throws a snowball at him which instead hits Mary Dempster, thereby precipitating the premature birth of Paul Dempster and her subsequent slide into madness. Staunton changes his name from Percy to Boy. A talented businessman and investor, he becomes fabulously wealthy in the sugar-processing business in Canada, eventually owning a conglomerate involved in many different industries (Alpha Corporation). A charming man, he has an immense need for sex.
Mary Dempster – Ten years older than Ramsay, she plays a pivotal role in his life. She has some saint-like qualities and is held in an insane asylum.
Paul Dempster – Son of Mary Dempster. Ten years younger than Dunstan Ramsay, he outshines Ramsay in conjuring. He leaves town with a travelling circus. He becomes the magician known as 'Magnus Eisengrim,' and is the protagonist of World of Wonders in this trilogy.
Diana Marfleet – The nurse who cares for Ramsay after he is wounded during World War I. She is his first sexual partner. Diana introduces him to musicals in England. He refuses to marry her, believing that she has too maternal a role in his life. 
Leola Staunton (née Cruikshank) – The first love of Ramsay, she marries Boy Staunton. Beautiful but volatile, she cannot live up to her ambitious husband's expectations.
Liselotte (Liesl) Vitzlipützli – Daughter of a millionaire Swiss watchmaker, she assists Magnus Eisengrim in his traveling magic show. She is bisexual, and unusually tall and with large features. She becomes Ramsay's confessor, lover, and critic.

References

Novels by Robertson Davies
1970 Canadian novels
Macmillan Publishers books
Gyges of Lydia